Hoseyn Khan Bayat was the second khan of the Maku Khanate from 1778 to 1822. He and his brother were the khan jointly. His great-grandson was Alexander Makinsky.

References

People from Maku, Iran
Maku Khanate
18th-century monarchs of Persia
19th-century monarchs of Persia
Year of birth unknown
Year of death unknown